The Hungarian occupation of Vidin was a period in the history of the city and region of Vidin, today in northwestern Bulgaria, when it was called Banate of Bulgaria under the rule of King Louis I of Hungary from 1365 to 1369.

Brief war

Before 1359–1360, the former heir to the Bulgarian crown Ivan Sratsimir had established himself as the ruler of the Vidin appanage of the Second Bulgarian Empire and had turned it into a largely independent entity. In early 1365 Louis I of Hungary, who like his predecessors styled himself "king of Bulgaria" (rex Bulgariae) among other titles, demanded that Ivan Sratsimir acknowledge his suzerainty and become his vassal. After Sratsimir's refusal, the Hungarian king undertook a campaign to conquer the Tsardom of Vidin. On 1 May 1365, he set off from Hungary; he reached Vidin on 30 May and captured the city on 2 June, after a brief siege.Kommander of hungarian army palatine Nicholas Kont, the condottiere Ulrich I count of Zilli, Magister Stefan Sira, Magister Georgi Zekul and some other Hungarian knights distinguished themselves in the campaign for the capture of Tsardom of Vidin. 
The Hungarians took Ivan Sratsimir and his family captive and imprisoned them in the Humnik fortress in Bosiljevo, Croatia. Shortly afterwards, the Hungarians seized the entire land of the Tsardom of Vidin (known as Bodony in Hungarian) and turned it into a province of the Kingdom of Hungary governed by a ban. Initially, the area was governed by Peter Himfi, the Count of Pozsony, and then by Denis Lackfi, styled "voivode of Transylvania, governor of Vidin and ruler of the counties of Temes and Szolnok".

Hungarian rule in Vidin
After establishing their administrative rule, the Hungarians proceeded to convert the local Bulgarian Orthodox population to Roman Catholicism with the assistance of Franciscan friars. Despite its short duration, this was one of the earliest Hungarian missionary dioceses. According to Hungarian data, the Franciscans converted 200,000 people or a third of the region's population; although the figure is considered grossly overestimated and unrealistic, among the converted were certainly Ivan Sratsimir and his royal family. That religious intolerance was reflected in the negative popular attitude towards the Hungarian overlordship, attested in a marginal note in an Orthodox religious book from the period: "This book was written by the sinful and unintelligent Dragan together with his brother Rayko in the days when the Hungarians ruled Vidin and it was great pain for the people at that time."

Ivan Sratsimir's father, Tsar Ivan Alexander, ruler of Bulgaria at Tarnovo, could do nothing to stop the Hungarian invasion and his son's capture. Several years later, however, he took advantage of Byzantine Emperor John V Palaiologos' detention at Vidin and Count of Savoy Amadeus VI's campaign on the Bulgarian Black Sea Coast to organize an Orthodox coalition and salvage Vidin. For joining the alliance, Ivan Alexander offered the Byzantine emperor the Black Sea ports south of Nesebar (Messembria); in return, however, John V had to pay 180,000 florins to Vladislav I Vlaicu, voivode of Wallachia. The Vlach voivode would, in return, seize Vidin and cede it to Ivan Alexander.

End of the banate
In 1369, the Hungarian occupation of Vidin was brought to an end. Although the initial campaign was not entirely successful because the Hungarians seized the city back, the ensuing negotiations between the Kingdom of Hungary and Ivan Alexander's allies, Vladislav I Vlaicu and Dobrotitsa, the despot of the semi-independent Dobrujan Principality of Karvuna, led to the return of the city to Bulgarian possession. It is thought that Ivan Sratsimir was reinstalled as the region's ruler in the autumn of 1369.

List of bans

References

Bibliography
 
  Engel, Pál (1996). Magyarország világi archontológiája, 1301–1457, I. ("Secular Archontology of Hungary, 1301–1457, Volume I"). História, MTA Történettudományi Intézete. Budapest. .
  Markó, László (2006). A magyar állam főméltóságai Szent Istvántól napjainkig: Életrajzi Lexikon ("Great Officers of State in Hungary from King Saint Stephen to Our Days: A Biographical Encyclopedia"). 2nd edition, Helikon Kiadó. 

History of Vidin
Banates of the Kingdom of Hungary
1360s conflicts
1360s in Europe
14th century in Bulgaria
14th century in Hungary